Echinomastus johnsonii (syn. Sclerocactus johnsonii) is a species of cactus known by the common names Johnson's beehive cactus and Johnson's fishhook cactus. It is native to the southwestern United States from eastern California to Utah, where it can be found in desert scrub habitat. The cactus may have yellow or pink flowers; the species is sometimes divided into two varieties on the basis of flower color.

References

External links
Jepson Manual Treatment
USDA Plants Profile
Photo gallery

Cactoideae